Syngnathus schmidti, the Black Sea pelagic pipefish or Schmidt's pipefish, is a pipefish species that inhabits the Black Sea and Sea of Azov. The specific name honours the Danish zoologist Ernst Johannes Schmidt (1877-1933).

References 

Fish of the Black Sea
Fish of the Sea of Azov
Fish of Europe
Fish described in 1927
schmidti